The 1974–75 Scottish Second Division was won by Falkirk, and Forfar Athletic finished bottom.

Due to the introduction of a new premier division in Scotland for season 1975-76 the top six teams from the Second Division were promoted to the First Division.

This season saw the Scottish Football League debut of Meadowbank Thistle.

Table

References

External links
 Scottish Football Archive

Scottish Division Two seasons
2
Scot